"Say My Name" is a song by French DJ David Guetta, American singer-songwriter Bebe Rexha and Colombian singer J Balvin. It was released as the eighth single from Guetta's album 7 on 26 October 2018. The track first charted upon the album's release in September 2018. It notably reached number two on Romania's Airplay 100 chart.

Background
It was reported by Spotify Latin America in July 2018 that Guetta was to release a collaboration titled "Say My Name" with Demi Lovato and J Balvin later in the month, but Guetta's manager Jean-Charles Carre announced on Instagram that the song was not being released, and Guetta instead issued "Don't Leave Me Alone" featuring Anne-Marie.

The following month, Guetta announced his album 7 and the song featured on the track listing as a collaboration with Bebe Rexha and Balvin. Rexha said of the song: "David and I had a lot of success with 'Hey Mama', but it was a weird time because I was credited with the song without being really known, [so] it was nice to have another song with him and everything start again from the beginning."

Charts

Weekly charts

Year-end charts

Certifications

Release history

References

2018 singles
2018 songs
David Guetta songs
Bebe Rexha songs
J Balvin songs
Songs written by David Guetta
Songs written by Emily Warren
Songs written by Giorgio Tuinfort
Songs written by J Balvin
Songs written by Thomas Troelsen
Moombahton songs
Song recordings produced by David Guetta